PQL (Process Query Language) is a special-purpose programming language for managing process models based on information about scenarios that these models describe.
A more expansive description on PQL can be found on http://processquerying.com/pql/.

Example
 SELECT * FROM * WHERE AlwaysOccurs(~"process payment");

 SELECT * FROM "\orders" WHERE Executes(<*,"make order",*,~"process payment",*>);

Books 
 - Process Querying Methods 1st ed. 2022 Edition

References

External links
 
 

Declarative programming languages
Query languages